Religion in Guinea is approximately 89 percent Muslim, 7 percent Christian, with 2 percent adhering to indigenous religious beliefs. There are also smaller numbers of Atheists and practitioners of other religions in the country. Much of the population, both Muslim and Christian, also incorporate indigenous African beliefs into their outlook.

The Association of Religion Date Archives (ARDA) has Muslims at 84.8%, Christian 3.7%, and Animist 11.3%.

Religions

Islam 

Guinean Muslims are generally Sunni of Maliki school of jurisprudence, influenced with Sufism, with many Ahmadiyya.

Muslims are generally Sunni, although the population of Shias is increasing.

Christianity 

Christian groups include Roman Catholics, Anglicans, Baptists, Seventh-day Adventists, and other Evangelical groups. Jehovah's Witnesses are active in the country and recognized by the Government.

Other religions 
There is a small community of the Baháʼí Faith. There are small numbers of Hindus, Buddhists, and traditional Chinese religious groups among the expatriate community.

Traditional beliefs 

The Sande society is a secret women's association found in Liberia, Sierra Leone and Guinea that initiates girls into adulthood, confers fertility, instills notions of morality and proper sexual comportment, and maintains an interest in the well-being of its members throughout their lives. In addition, Sande champions women's social and political interests and promotes their solidarity vis-a-vis the Poro society, a complementary institution for men. Today this social institution is found among the Bassa, Gola, Kissi, Kpelle, Loma, Mano and Vai of Liberia.

Throughout the region, the complementarity of men's and women's gender roles – evident in such diverse activities as farming, cloth production, and musical performances – reach full expression. The women's Sande and men's Poro associations alternate political and ritual control of "the land" (a concept embracing the natural and supernatural worlds) for periods of three and four years respectively. During Sande's sovereignty, all signs of the men's society are banished.

At the end of this three-year period, the Sande leadership "turns over the land" to its counterparts in the Poro Society for another four years, and after a rest period the ritual cycle begins anew. The alternating three- and four-year initiation cycles for women and men respectively are one example of the widespread use of the numbers 3 and 4 to signify the gender of people, places and events; together the numbers equal seven, a sacred number throughout the region.

Religious geography 
Muslims constitute a majority in all four major regions of Guinea. Christians are most numerous in Conakry, large cities, the south, and the eastern Forest Region. Indigenous religious beliefs are most prevalent in the Forest Region.

Religious freedom

Formal protections 
The Constitution of Guinea, although suspended from the time of the 2009 military junta until after the 2010 democratic elections, writes that Guinea is a secular state where all enjoy equality before the law, regardless of religion. The constitution provides for the right of individuals to choose, change, and practice the religion of their choice.

The Guinean government's Secretariat of Religious Affairs aims to promote better relations among religious denominations and ameliorate interethnic tensions. The secretary general of religious affairs appoints six national directors to lead the offices of Christian affairs, Islamic affairs, pilgrimages, places of worship, economic affairs and the endowment, and general inspector.

The imams and administrative staff of the principal mosque in the capital city of Conakry, and the principal mosques in the main cities of the four regions,  are government employees. These mosques are directly under the administration of the government.

The government observes the following religious holidays as national holidays: the Birth of the Prophet Muhammad, Easter Monday, Assumption Day, Eid al-Fitr, Tabaski, and Christmas.

In Guinean society 
In some parts of Guinea, strong familial, communal, cultural, social, or economic pressure discourage conversion from Islam. It has been reported that in the town of Dinguiraye, a holy city for African Muslims, public celebration of non-Muslim religious holidays or festivals are not permitted. Dinguiraye town authorities have also refused permission to build a church within its boundaries.

Ethno-religious violence 

There were 3 days of ethno-religious fighting in the city of Nzerekore in July 2013. Fighting between ethnic Kpelle, who are Christian or animist, and ethnic Konianke, who are Muslims and close to the larger Malinke ethnic group, left at least 54 dead. The dead included people who were killed with machetes and burned alive. The violence ended after the Guinea military imposed a curfew, and President Conde made a televised appeal for calm.

References